This article lists the dams and reservoirs in Alabama. In 2015, the U.S. Army Corps of Engineers estimated that the state has about 2,271 dams.

Reservoirs and manmade lakes with known dams

See also
 List of dams and reservoirs in the United States
 List of dams and reservoirs of the Tennessee River
 List of lakes
 List of lakes in Alabama

References

External links
Lakes in Alabama, United States

Alabama
Dams
Dams